Bernard Rahis (12 February 1933 – 16 March 2008) was a French football striker.

External links
 
 
Profile of Bernard Rahis 
Biographical sketch of Bernard Rahis 

1933 births
2008 deaths
French footballers
French expatriate footballers
France international footballers
Association football forwards
Nîmes Olympique players
Servette FC players
Lille OSC players
Ligue 1 players
FC Annecy players
People from Blida
Expatriate footballers in Switzerland
French expatriate sportspeople in Switzerland